Evan Winter is a Canadian author of epic fantasy. His first novel, The Rage of Dragons, was originally self-published. In 2020, TIME named it one of the 100 best fantasy books of all time. A sequel, called The Fires of Vengeance, was published in 2020.

Following its initial publication, Orbit Books re-released The Rage of Dragons and signed Winter to a four-book deal. The Rage of Dragons was on the long list of the CBCs 2020 Canada Reads.

Biography 
Winter was born in England and raised in Zambia. He has worked as a filmmaker.

Bibliography

The Burning series
 The Rage of Dragons (2019)
 The Fires of Vengeance (2020)
 The Lord of Demons (TBA)

References 

21st-century Canadian novelists
Year of birth missing (living people)
Place of birth missing (living people)
Canadian fantasy writers
Living people
Black speculative fiction authors